The Jules Verne Trophy is a prize for the fastest circumnavigation of the world by any type of yacht with no restrictions on the size of the crew provided the vessel has registered with the organization and paid an entry fee. A vessel holding the Jules Verne trophy will not necessarily hold the absolute round the world record. The trophy was first awarded to the first yacht which sailed around the world in less than 80 days. The name of the award is a reference to the Jules Verne novel Around the World in Eighty Days in which Phileas Fogg traverses the planet (albeit by railroad and steamboat) in 80 days. The current holder is IDEC Sport skippered by Francis Joyon in 40 days 23 hours 30 minutes 30 seconds.

Route

The Jules Verne Trophy's starting point is defined by an imaginary line between the  Créac'h lighthouse on Ouessant (Ushant) Island, France, and the Lizard Lighthouse, UK. The boats have to circumnavigate the world leaving the capes of Good Hope, Leeuwin, and Horn to port and cross the starting line in the opposite direction.
The starting line is open as of the official ratification of the trophy's rules by the World Sailing Speed Record Council.

Rules
The Jules Verne Trophy is awarded to the challenger who breaks the previous Jules Verne record of the round the world voyage under sail. The winner holds the trophy until such time as his/her record has been bettered. The boats must solely be propelled by natural forces of the wind and of the crew, but the trophy is open to any type of boat with no restrictions. Crew size is not restricted either.

The circumnavigation must be completed non-stop and with no physical outside assistance, although on-shore weather routing is allowed. The challengers must respect certain safety rules.

History
The original idea for this competition has been attributed to Yves Le Cornec in 1985. The rules were defined in 1990. A committee was put in place to guarantee respect of the rules and fairplay. This committee included Peter Blake, Florence Arthaud, Jean François Coste, Yvon Fauconnier, Gabrie Guilly, Robin Knox-Johnston, Titouan Lamazou, Yves Le Cornec, Bruno Peyron, Olivier de Kersauson, and Didier Ragot.

While the current holder of the trophy, Francis Joyon, also holds the around the world sailing record, this has not always been the case. In 2004 Steve Fossett broke the world record with the catamaran Cheyenne but was not awarded the trophy. According to reports, the trophy organizers requested a higher entrance fee from Fossett than from the other competitors, the difference which he refused to pay. The winner of the trophy that year was Olivier de Kersauson on Geronimo, with a time which was five days slower than Fossett's world record.

Summary of intermediate records 

The best passage times are shared between 4 boats:
  Banque Populaire V , designed in 2006, launched in 2008 and renamed "Maxi Spindrift 2" in 2013
  Groupama 3 , designed in 2004, launched in 2006 and renamed  IDEC sport  in 2015
  Macif , designed in 2013, launched in 2015 and since then mainly singlehanded by François Gabart
  :fr:Maxi Edmond de Rothschild  designed in 2014, launched in 2017

Adding the record times of the various intermediate routes, gives a total record round the world in 36 days 22 hours and 36 minutes, or 4 days better than the record established in 2017 by Francis Joyon on  IDEC sport .

2016 record
Francis Joyon took possession of the former Groupama 3 on October 2, 2015, after three weeks of work at Multiplast, in Vannes. He chose an intermediate configuration between the initial power and a reduced rigging for solo races. Closer to the lightness and ergonomics sought alone, less versatile in particular in light winds, Joyon's choices paid off during his two passages in the southern seas at the end of 2015 and again at the end of 2016, earning him numerous records. With a crew reduced to six people,  IDEC Sport  was ready to attempt the Jules-Verne Trophy, held since 2011 by Loïck Peyron with a time of 45 days, 13 hours, 42 minutes and 53 seconds.

After an attempt in November 2016 met with unfavorable weather in the doldrums and the South Atlantic, and a shock that slightly damaged her fin, Joyon set out again on December 16, 2016 to conquer the trophy. He arrived on  January 26, 2017 with a new around the world sailing record of 40 days 23 h 30 min 30 s.
During their 2016 attempt for the Jules-Verne Trophy, Francis Joyon and his crew  broke numerous intermediate records: four have been formalized and are the subject of records duly certified by the WSSRC.

They made quick crossings of the southern seas starting with the Indian Ocean, covering 8091,73 miles in 10 days (an average of 809 miles per day). This episode began ahead of the front of a depression which moved at a speed corresponding to the boat's potential from South America to the Pacific Ocean. During 12 days, the wind remained port tack, blowing constantly at over 30 knots, an ideal configuration for speed records. Top speeds varied between 38 and 44 knots.

After passing New Zealand and the Antimeridian, sailing port tack 205 degrees longitude (25 degrees West to Antimeridian) in the southern seas, the crew jibed in the transition between two depressions, and managed to catch up with the weather system in front of them over the Pacific Ocean, setting off again at more than 30 knots daily average towards Cape Horn.

He then signs a performance increase of 30 to 40% compared to Loïck Peyron's record 5 years earlier. Leaving the southern seas with a lead of 4 days 6 hours 35 min over Peyron's previous record, Joyon and his crew regained  on the record during this stretch.

Banque Populaire V, the previous recordholder, had to cover almost 2600 more miles (29,002 miles).

Distance records broken during the 2016 campaign
While the best day of Loïck Peyron's previous record was the only day above 800 miles from his record (811 miles over 24 hours, or 33.79 knots average), Francis Joyon maintains a speed above 800 daily miles for 10 consecutive days.

It thus improves a large number of progress records by a sailboat over a given period:

Other records broken during the 2016 campaign
Boat record and the second longest distance covered by a sailboat in 24 hours with 894 miles.
6 consecutive days at an average of 850.7 miles / 24 h (35.45 knots)
Ushant-Cape Leeuwin 17 d 06 h 59 min 45 (time of Loïck Peyron during the 2011 record: 17 d 23 h 57 min)
Ushant-Tasmania 18 d 18 h 31 min (time of Loïck Peyron during the 2011 record: 20 d 07 h 11 min)
Ushant-Antiméridien 20 d 07 h 01 (time of Loïck Peyron during the 2011 record: 22 d 11 h 34 min)
Ushant-Cape Horn: 26 d 15 h 45 min (time of Loïck Peyron during the 2011 record: 30 d 22 h 19 min)
Ecuador - Cape Leeuwin: 11 d 12 h (time of Loïck Peyron during the 2011 record: 12 d 9 h 2 min)
Cape Agulhas-cape Leeuwin in 4 days 9 h 37 min 46 at an average speed of 35.08 knots over ground (3,705 miles) or 842 miles in 24 hours (6 days 8 min or 36% more for Loïck Peyron's previous record)
Cape Leeuwin - Cape Horn in 9 d 08 h 46 min (12 d 22 h 22 min or 38% more for Loïck Peyron's previous record)
Cape of Good Hope - Cape Horn in 13 d 20 h 13 min (19 d 00 h 31 min or 37% more for Loïck Peyron's previous record)
Cape of Good Hope - Cape Leeuwin: 4 d 11 h 31 min (6 d 02 h 09 min or 36% more for Loïck Peyron's previous record in 2011)
Cap Leeuwin - Cape Horn in 9 d 08 h 46 min (12 d 22 h 22 min or 38% more for Loïck Peyron's previous record)
Indian Ocean: 5 d 21 h 7 min 45 s (WSSRC reference) (8 d 07 h 23 min or 41% more for Loïck Peyron during the 2011 record)
Pacific Ocean: 7 d 21 h 13 min 31 s (WSSRC reference) (10 d 15 h 07 min or 39% more for Loïck Peyron during the 2011 record)
Ecuador-Ecuador record: 29 d 9 h 10 min 55 s (WSSRC reference) (32 d 11 h 52 min or 11% more for Loïck Peyron during the 2011 record)
North Atlantic return record: 5 d 19 h 21 min (7 d 10 h 58 min or 25% more for Loïck Peyron during the 2011 record)

Jules Verne Trophy records

!Year!!Skipper!!Yacht!!Type!!Time
|-
|2017|| Francis Joyon||IDEC Sport||Trimaran||style="background:#ffffbf;|40 days 23 hours 30 minutes 30 seconds
|-
|2012|| Loïck Peyron||Banque Populaire V||Trimaran||45 days 13 hours 42 minutes 53 seconds
|-
|2010|| Franck Cammas||Groupama 3||Trimaran||48 days 7 hours 44 minutes 52 seconds
|-
|2005|| Bruno Peyron||Orange II||Catamaran||50 days 16 hours 20 minutes 4 seconds
|-
|2004|| Olivier de Kersauson||Geronimo||Trimaran||63 days 13 hours 59 minutes 46 seconds
|-
|2002|| Bruno Peyron||Orange||Catamaran||64 days 8 hours 37 minutes 24 seconds
|-
|1997|| Olivier de Kersauson||Sport Elec||Trimaran||71 days 14 hours 22 minutes 8 seconds
|-
|1994|| Robin Knox-Johnston Peter Blake||ENZA New Zealand||Catamaran||74 days 22 hours 17 minutes 22 seconds
|-
|1993|| Bruno Peyron||Explorer||Catamaran||79 days 6 hours 15 minutes 56 seconds
|-

Notable performances 
During her Jules-Verne trophy record in 2011–2012, the Banque Populaire V skippered by Loïck Peyron covered 811.70 nautical miles in 24 hours on 3 December 2011 at 11:45 UT, posting 28 days over 600 miles, including 9 days over 700 miles and 1 day over 800 miles.

During her Jules-Verne trophy record in 2009–2010, the trimaran Groupama 3 skippered by Franck Cammas covered 798 nautical miles in 24 hours on 13 February 2010 at 5 p.m. UT, showing 17 days over 600 miles, including 10 days over 700 miles.

During her Jules-Verne trophy record in 2016–2017, the trimaran Idec sport skippered by Francis Joyon covered 894 nautical miles in 24 hours, and 10 consecutive days at 809 miles / 24 h. Francis Joyon rounds Cape Horn, 16 days after riding off of South America, and after a course of nearly 12,000 miles above an average of 30 knots (730.16 miles / 24 h over 16 days). He then signs a performance increase of between 30 and 40% compared to the record to be broken by Loïck Peyron 5 years earlier. Leaving the southern seas with a lead of 4 j 06 h 35 min over Loïck Peyron's previous record, Francis Joyon and his crew regained the equivalent of 2,800 miles on the record during this episode.

During the aborted attempt of 2019, Yann Guichard sets a new record crossing the equator in 4 days 19 h 57 min and, thanks to favorable weather conditions, lines up 4,812.1 miles from the 11th to 16th day, or 802 miles / day for 6 consecutive days.

During his record around the world Singlehanded in 2017, 24 hour distance record for François Gabart on Macif: 850,68 miles in 24h.

During his attempt for the Jules Verne Trophy on December 5, 2020, Thomas Coville on :fr:Sodebo Ultim 3 covered 889.9 miles in 24 hours (37.1 knots average, top speed 48.9 knots).

Passage records

Intermediate records

Failed record attempts

The trophy
The "Trophy Jules Verne" was the subject of a public order of the visual arts delegation with the American artist Tom Shannon and is patroned by the French Ministry of Culture.

The work is a floating hull on a magnetic field, much as an anchorage for a ship. All dimensions have rigorous symbolic meaning. The midship beam of the hull corresponds to the diameter of the Earth, the ray of each end is proportional to that of the moon and the radius of the curvature of the frames is that of the sun. The competitors of the Trophy Jules Verne race around the Earth against time, with only the sun and the moon as companions and time keepers.

The sculpture is placed on a cast aluminium base, on which the names of the sailors having won the Trophy are engraved. The Musée national de la Marine in Paris hosts and maintains the Trophy. Each winner receives a miniature of the Trophy, magnetized like the original one.

When a record is broken, an official ceremony is held for the previous record holders to hand over the trophy to the new record holders, who are given the hull and must place it in its magnetic field mooring.

See also

 Circumnavigation
 List of circumnavigations
 List of youth solo sailing circumnavigations
Around the world in 80 days
Competitions and prizes
 Global Challenge
 Jules Verne Trophy
 The race
 Oryx Quest
 Vendée Globe
Other speed sailing records
 Speed sailing record
 World Sailing Speed Record Council
 Transatlantic sailing record
 Around the world sailing record

References

External links
 
 IDEC Sport Sailing
 Spindrift racing

Awards established in 1990
Round-the-world sailing competitions
Sailing awards
Around the World in Eighty Days